José David Lápuz (19 April 1938 – 8 March 2023) was a Filipino educator and cultural administrator. Lapuz previously served as one of the commissioners of the UNESCO National Commission of the Philippines (UNACOM). and was a member of the UNESCO Advisory Committee on Human Rights and Poverty based in Paris. He previously worked as a lecturer in international relations and political science at the Polytechnic University of the Philippines until his death in 2023.

Career
Lapuz received his bachelor's degree at the University of the Philippines and his post-graduate studies in International Politics and Foreign Policy at the University of Glasgow in Scotland. He started teaching at the University of Santo Tomas in 1970.

Lapuz attended and read papers before the Annual Conference of the Political Studies Association of the United Kingdom, the American Political Science Association in Washington, D.C. and the International Studies Association of New York.  He lectured in the following schools: Eastern Washington University, Harvard, East Carolina University, UCLA, and the University of London, L.S.E., Glasgow University and Oxford University. He has also lectured at the Leningrad State University, now St. Petersburg, Russian Federation; and the then USSR Institute of Oriental Studies, Moscow.  He also delivered formal lectures at the Humboldt Universitat Zu Berlin (University of Berlin) in Berlin, Germany.

In 1999, Lapuz was first appointed as United Nations Educational, Scientific, and Cultural Organization (Unesco) commissioner to the Committee on Social and Human Sciences. In 2002, he was re-appointed for a further three-year term.

In March 2009, President Gloria Macapagal Arroyo appointed Lápuz as Presidential Consultant. By November 2009, he was appointed as commissioner and board member of the National Historical Institute.

In March 2017, Lapuz was appointed by President Rodrigo Duterte as Presidential Consultant for Education and International Organization under the Office of the President. He was Duterte's political science professor at the Lyceum of the Philippines University in the 1960s. Earlier, in 2016, President Duterte had expressed his intent to appoint Lapuz as the Chairperson of the Commission on Higher Education. However, this was met with criticism due to plagiarism allegations committed by Lapuz, as well as questions on qualification as raised by his former students.

References

External links
Knights of Rizal website

1938 births
2023 deaths
Advisers to the President of the Philippines
Alumni of the University of Glasgow
Arroyo administration personnel
Duterte administration personnel
East Carolina University people
Filipino educators
Filipino officials of the United Nations
People involved in plagiarism controversies
Academic staff of Polytechnic University of the Philippines
UNESCO officials
University of the Philippines Diliman alumni
Academic staff of the University of Santo Tomas